Sons of Anarchy: Songs of Anarchy Vol. 2 is a soundtrack album featuring music from the FX television program Sons of Anarchy, and is a follow-up to the 2011 release Songs of Anarchy: Music from Sons of Anarchy Seasons 1–4 and several earlier EPs from the popular show. Songs include covers of 
"Sympathy for the Devil," "Higher Ground," and "Travelin' Band," as well as several original tracks. Performers include Jane's Addiction, with most tracks performed by longtime SOA contributors The Forest Rangers.

The Forest Rangers serve as the Sons Of Anarchy house band, which includes the show's music composer Bob Thiele Jr, Greg Leisz (guitar/banjo), John Philip Shenale (keyboards), Lyle Workman (guitar), Dave Way (recording Engineer and Sergeant at Arms), Davey Faragher (bass), Brian Macleod (drums) and Velvet Revolver guitarist Dave Kushner.

Track listing

Personnel
The album's credits and personnel can be obtained from Allmusic.

 
The Forest Rangers
 Bob Thiele Jr. — guitar, acoustic guitar, bass, piano, organ, keyboard, synthesizer, vocal harmonies
 Greg Leisz — guitar, banjo, lap steel guitar, mandolin
 John Philip Shenale — organ, piano, Mexican harp
 Lyle Workman — vocals, guitar
 Dave Kushner — guitar, bass
 Davey Faragher — bass
 Brian Macleod — drums, hand drums

Additional musicians
 Katey Sagal — vocals, backing vocals
 Curtis Stigers — vocals
 Audra Mae — vocals
 Franky Perez — vocals
 Paul Brady — vocals
 Alison Mosshart — vocals

 
Production personnel
 Bob Thiele Jr. — producer, arranger
 Kurt Sutter — producer, arranger
 Dave Kushner — producer
 Matt Hyde — producer, engineer, mixer
 Matt Drenik — producer, engineer, mixer
 Jason Buntz — engineer
 Brian Scheuble — engineer, mixer
 Dave Way — engineer, mixer
 Ed Cherney — mixer
 Dave Warren — cover art, design

References

2011 albums
Columbia Records albums
Sons of Anarchy
Television soundtracks